Div Kola or Div Kala, also rendered as Div Kalay, may refer to:
  Div Kola-ye Alimun, Juybar County
 Div Kola-ye Olya, Qaem Shahr County
 Div Kola-ye Sofla, Qaem Shahr County